Lakshmi Priya (born Sabeena Abdul Latheef; 11 March 1985) is an Indian actress who appears in Malayalam films. She participated in Bigg Boss Malayalam Season 4.

Early life
She was born on 11 March 1985 to Kabir, who was from Haripad, and Ramlath, in a Muslim family. She has two sisters. Her parents divorced when she was two-and-a-half years old. Since then, she was raised by her paternal uncle Latheef, who was her guardian. Born in Kayamkulam, she was brought up in Nooranad, where she lived with her grandmother, paternal uncle and aunt in her father's ancestral home. Lakshmi Priya was estranged by her parents. She first met her father at age five, until age 14, she believed that her mother died while she was still alive. Lakshmi Priya had her school education from St.Mary's LPS in Charummoodu, CBMHS Nooranad, and PUM Vocational Higher Secondary School in Pallickal. She did not complete her higher secondary education. At age 16, she began acting in professional plays. She is a dancer and has won the Kalathilakam title.

Career
She has done a lot of supporting roles in Malayalam film industry.

Personal life
She is married to P. Jayesh, son of musician Pattanakkad Purushothaman, on 20 April 2005. Since then, she is a practicing Hindu. They have a daughter named Mathangi Jai. They reside in Kakkanad. In 2019, she wrote a book titled Kadhayum Kadhapathrangalum Sangalpikamalla, which can be called as an autobiography or a memoir.

Filmography

TV serials

Television Shows

References

External links

Living people
Actresses in Malayalam cinema
Indian film actresses
20th-century Indian actresses
Indian Hindus
Kerala State Film Award winners
21st-century Indian actresses
Indian former Muslims
Actresses in Malayalam television
Indian television actresses
Actresses in Tamil cinema
1985 births
Converts to Hinduism
Converts to Hinduism from Islam
Bigg Boss Malayalam contestants